The Aspidodiadematidae are a family of sea urchins.

Characteristics 
All the members of the two extant genera, Aspidodiadema and Plesiodiadema, are found in tropical seas at bathyal and abyssal depths, often on the submarine slopes of islands. The genera Culozoma, Eosalenia, and Gymnotiara are known only from the fossil record. Study of the larval development of Aspidodiadema jacobyi suggests that the family should be elevated to ordinal status as a sister clade of the order Diadematoida, or possibly be regarded as a sister clade of the other families within that order.

Genera
These genera and species are listed in the World Register of Marine Species:

References